Pedro Emilio Torres (29 April 1906 – 10 January 1998) was a Colombian middle-distance runner. He competed in the men's 1500 metres at the 1936 Summer Olympics and finished ninth in his heat.

References

1906 births
1998 deaths
Athletes (track and field) at the 1936 Summer Olympics
Colombian male middle-distance runners
Olympic athletes of Colombia
20th-century Colombian people